Hana Church is a parish church of the Church of Norway in the large Sandnes municipality in Rogaland county, Norway. It is located in the borough of Hana in the city of Sandnes in the far western part of the municipality. It sits along the eastern shore of the Gandsfjorden, just north of the city centre. It is the church for the Hana parish which is part of the Sandnes prosti (deanery) in the Diocese of Stavanger. The white and gray, concrete church was built in a octagonal design in 1997 using designs by the architect Kolbjørn Jensen from the architectural firm Signatur Arkitekter. The church seats about 415 people.

See also
List of churches in Rogaland

References

Sandnes
Churches in Rogaland
20th-century Church of Norway church buildings
Churches completed in 1997
1997 establishments in Norway